Skis Rossignol S.A., or simply Rossignol, is a French manufacturer of alpine, snowboard, and Nordic equipment, as well as related outerwear and accessories, located in Isère, France.  Rossignol was one of the first companies to produce plastic skis. The company also owns the brands Dynastar and LOOK.  In 2005, Rossignol was bought by  boardsport equipment manufacturer Quiksilver for $560 million. In 2008, Quiksilver made a deal to sell Rossignol for $147 million to a former chief executive, Bruno Cercley.

In July 2013, Macquarie sold the Rossignol Group, along with its subsidiaries Lange and Dynastar, to a partnership of Altor Equity Partners (a Swedish investment group) and the Boix-Vives family.

History

The company was founded in 1907 by Abel Rossignol, who manufactured wood products (such as spindles) for the textile industry. Rossignol, a committed skier, used his carpentry skills to make a pair of skis out of solid wood. In 1937, Émile Allais of France became triple world champion on Rossignol Olympic 41 skis.

When Laurent Boix-Vives bought the company in 1956, the company only focused on skiing equipment and began to sell them worldwide. Rossignol had a breakthrough during the 1960 Winter Olympics in Squaw Valley, California, United States, when Jean Vuarnet of France won the downhill on Allais 60s, the company's first all-metal skis.

In 1964, Rossignol released the Strato, its first fiberglass ski.

In the 1970s, Rossignol set up a distribution company in the U.S., launching its first Nordic skis, and soon became the world's largest ski manufacturer. At the 1988 Winter Olympics in Calgary, Alberta, Canada, Rossignol triumphed, winning six out of 10 gold medals in alpine events.

In 1990, Rossignol acquired the Caber boot factory in Italy and rebranded the product under the Rossignol label (Rossignol already controlled the Lange ski boot brand). The company also acquired the Geze and Look ski-bindings ranges, rebranding Geze. It soon moved into snowboards and mountain clothing.

Athletes using Rossignol products won at both the Winter Olympic games in Albertville and in Lillehammer.

Alberto Tomba of Italy, the dominant technical skier of the late 1980s and 1990s, raced on Rossignol skis.

Rossignol is the French word for nightingale.

Team riders and skiers

Freestyle

Mike Hopkins
Olivier Meynet
Xavier Bertoni
Lynsey Dyer
Manu Gaidet
Kattia Griffiths
JF Houle
Kye Petersen
Dan Treadway

Alpine

Pierrick Bourgeat
Johan Clarey
Didier Défago
Gauthier de Tessieres
Jean-Baptiste Grange
Mattias Hargin
Werner Heel
Jan Hudec
Christof Innerhofer
Mike Janyk
Lars Elton Myhre
Manuel Osborne-Paradis
Alessandro Roberto
Jean-Philippe Roy
Matik Skube
Adrien Theaux
Stéphane Tissot
Silvan Zurbriggen
Brigitte Acton
Fränzi Aufdenblatten
Anne-Sophie Barthet
Nike Bent
Marion Bertrand
Catherine Borghi
Stacey Cook
Ana Drev
Allison Forsyth
Maria Pietilä Holmner
Jessica Kelley
Jessica Lindell-Vikarby
Christina Lustenberger
Tina Maze
Urska Rabic
Petra Robnik
Geneviève Simard
Vanessa Vidal
Kathrin Wilhelm
Tessa Worley
Veronika Zuzulova
Petra Vlhová 

Snowboard

Jonas Emery
Mathieu Crépel
Kjersti Buaas
Xavier de Le Rue
Jeremy Jones 1989-2009
Wyatt Caldwell
Beji Ritche
Doriane Vidal
Erin Valvarde

Biathlon
Martin Fourcade

See also
 Lange

References

 Chappaz, Gilles (2008) La légende Rossignol - 100 Ans Free Presse

External links
 Official website
 The Story Behind Rossignol Skis

Sportswear brands
Clothing companies of France
Sporting goods manufacturers of France
Rossignol
French brands
Cycle manufacturers of France
Snowboarding